The Defence Research Establishments were a number of separate UK Ministry of Defence Research Establishments, dating back to World War II, World War I, or even earlier. Each establishment had its own head; known as the Director or the Superintendent. Prior to the formation of the Ministry of Defence each of the three Services, i.e. the Royal Air Force, the Admiralty and the War Office, had their own research establishments; although some establishments had tri-service functions.

World War II
At the beginning of World War II there were about a dozen research and development establishments. The main ones were:
 The Royal Aircraft Establishment - Air
 The Aeroplane and Armament Experimental Establishment - Air
 The Telecommunications Research Establishment - Air
 The Admiralty Research Laboratory - Sea
 The Admiralty Compass Observatory - Sea
 The Naval Construction Research Establishment - Sea
 The Armaments Research Department - Triservice

Formation, merging and breakup
Many establishments were formed, merged or changed their names over time to meet the needs of the UK Government at the time. These changes also involved the opening of new sites, operating across multiple sites, change of site location; and closing of sites.

For example, the Explosives Research and Development Establishment (ERDE), merged with the Rocket Propulsion Establishment and became the Propellants, Explosives and Rocket Motor Establishment (PERME). PERME became part of the Royal Armament Research and Development Establishment (RARDE).

Amalgamation into DERA and split into QinetiQ and Dstl 
Some of these establishments were merged in 1991 to form the Defence Research Agency (DRA). More were added to DRA in 1995 to form the Defence Evaluation and Research Agency (DERA).

DERA was split up in the early 2000s, with the major part becoming known as QinetiQ and the more sensitive parts retained as Dstl.

References
 Postan, M.M., Hay, D. and Scott, J.D. (1964). Design and Development of Weapons: Studies in Governmental and Industrial Organisation. (History of the Second World War: United Kingdom Civil Series). London: Her Majesty's Stationery Office and Longmans, Green and Co.

See also
 Royal Aircraft Establishment (RAE)
 Royal Armament Research and Development Establishment (RARDE)
 Royal Signals and Radar Establishment (RSRE)

Government munitions production in the United Kingdom
Ministry of Defence (United Kingdom)
Military research establishments of the United Kingdom